Bonne Bouche is an aged goat's milk cheese made by Vermont Creamery, of Websterville, Vermont, United States. "Bonne bouche" is French for "tasty bite".

Made with fresh pasteurized goats’ milk from Vermont and Canadian farms, the curd is hand ladled, sprinkled with poplar ash, and aged to develop a rind.  This cheese develops a wrinkled, geotrichum-rind also known as a "geo" rind. After aging for ten days at the creamery, the cheeses are packaged and sent to market where they will continue to age up to eighty days. As a young cheese, the rind has a pleasant yeast flavor and creamy interior becoming softer and more piquant with time.

Awards
2011 — Soft goats’ milk cheese plain, mold ripened: World Cheese Awards
2012 — Best Cheese or Dairy Product: Fancy Food Show
2013 — 1st Place American Originals Recipe: American Cheese Society

See also
 List of goat milk cheeses

References

External links
Vermont Creamery website

American cheeses
Goat's-milk cheeses
Vermont cuisine
Food and drink companies based in Vermont
Products introduced in 2001